Mohamed Kharnadji was the Dey of the Regency of Algiers briefly in March - April 1815, and was assassinated after having been in office for only 17 days.

References 

1815 deaths
Deys of Algiers
Year of birth missing